Streptomyces thinghirensis is a bacterium species from the genus of Streptomyces which has been isolated from rhizosphere soil from the grape plant Vitis vinifera in Thinghir in Morocco.

See also 
 List of Streptomyces species

References

Further reading

External links
Type strain of Streptomyces thinghirensis at BacDive -  the Bacterial Diversity Metadatabase

thinghirensis
Bacteria described in 2009